Teddy Baubigny (born 2 September 1998) is a French rugby union player. His position is hooker, and he currently plays for Toulon in the Top 14.
He was named in the French squad for the 2020 Six Nations Championship.

References

External links
Racing 92 profile
Its Rugby profile

1998 births
Living people
French rugby union players
Rugby union hookers
Racing 92 players
RC Toulonnais players
People from Meaux
France international rugby union players
Sportspeople from Seine-et-Marne